Tim Kinsella Sings the Songs of Marvin Tate by Leroy Bach Featuring Angel Olsen is a 2013 collaborative album by Tim Kinsella, Marvin Tate, Leroy Bach, and Angel Olsen.

Track listing
 Idolize - 1:38
 The Crossing Guard - 2:10
 Daddy Wants To Be A Robin - 1:38
 The Bus Is Coming - 1:55
 Snowglobe -3:07
 All In My Head - 1:42
 The Baseball Players Wife - 4:05
 This Time (Not The Next Time) - 2:48
 100 Kinds of Crazy - 1:35
 Sidetracked In Miami - 2:36
 God Ain't Ready For You - 0:32
 Never Finished Counting - 1:51

References

2013 albums
Collaborative albums
Joyful Noise Recordings albums